The following is a list of notable deaths in August 2019.

Entries for each day are listed alphabetically by surname. A typical entry lists information in the following sequence:
 Name, age, country of citizenship at birth, subsequent country of citizenship (if applicable), reason for notability, cause of death (if known), and reference.

August 2019

1
Levan Aleksidze, 93, Georgian legal scholar.
Munir Al Yafi, 44–45, Yemeni military commander (Southern Movement), missile attack.
Gordon Brand Jnr, 60, Scottish golfer, heart attack.
William Brown, 74, British academic, Master of Darwin College (2000–2012).
Puși Dinulescu, 76, Romanian playwright and film director, heart attack.
Jack Dolbin, 70, American football player (Denver Broncos).
Charles Fadley, 77, American physicist, cancer.
Ian Gibbons, 67, English keyboardist (The Kinks), bladder cancer.
Sadou Hayatou, 77, Cameroonian politician, Prime Minister (1991–1992).
Annemarie Huber-Hotz, 70, Swiss politician, Federal Chancellor (2000–2007) and President of the Swiss Red Cross (since 2011), heart attack.
Barry Hughart, 85, American author.
Minoru Kamata, 80, Japanese baseball player (Osaka/Hanshin Tigers, Kintetsu Buffaloes), lung cancer.
Margot Lovejoy, 88, American historian of art and technology, stroke.
Francis Luiggi, 87, French Olympic bobsledder (1968).
Martin Mayer, 91, American economist and writer (The Bankers), complications from Parkinson's disease.
Abdirahman Omar Osman, 53, Somali politician, Minister of Commerce and Industry (2015–2017) and Mayor of Mogadishu (since 2018), bombing.
Marjan Pečar, 78, Slovenian Olympic ski jumper.
D. A. Pennebaker, 94, American documentary filmmaker (Dont Look Back, Monterey Pop, Ziggy Stardust and the Spiders from Mars).
Günter Perleberg, 84, German sprint canoeist, Olympic champion (1960).
Barrington Pheloung, 65, Australian composer (Inspector Morse).
Maurice Pope, 93, British classical linguist.
Georgios Pozidis, 63, Greek Olympic wrestler (1980, 1984).
Milovan Minja Prelević, 49, Montenegrin football player (Budućnost, OFK Beograd) and manager (Hangzhou Wuyue Qiantang), heart attack.
Harley Race, 76, American Hall of Fame professional wrestler (AWA, CSW) and trainer (Harley Race's Wrestling Academy), lung cancer.
Anders P. Ravn, 71, Danish computer scientist.
Sarat Saikia, 71, Indian politician, Assam Legislative Assembly (2001–2016).
Llew Summers, 72, New Zealand sculptor.
R. G. Tiedemann, 78, German historian.
Jesus Tuquib, 89, Filipino Roman Catholic prelate, Archbishop of Cagayan de Oro (1988–2006).
Richard Vyškovský, 90, Czech architect.
Rodolfo Zapata, 87, Argentine singer.
Ludwig Zeller, 92, Chilean poet.
Zha Quanxing, 94, Chinese electrochemist.

2
Carl Bell, 71, American physician.
Gunder Bengtsson, 73, Swedish football manager (IFK Göteborg, Panathinaikos, Feyenoord).
David Bevington, 88, American literary scholar.
Roberto Bodegas, 86, Spanish film director and screenwriter (Spaniards in Paris).
Vahakn Dadrian, 93, Armenian-American sociologist and historian.
Oluf Fuglerud, 94, Norwegian journalist and politician.
Devadas Kanakala, 74, Indian actor (Chettu Kinda Pleader, Gang Leader, Pedababu).
Dawid Kostecki, 38, Polish professional boxer, suicide by hanging.
Max Marsille, 88, Belgian Olympic boxer (1952).
Ai Morinaga, 38, Japanese manga artist (My Heavenly Hockey Club, Maniattemasu, Your and My Secret).
Gildo Cunha do Nascimento, 79, Brazilian footballer (Palmeiras, Flamengo, Paranaense).
Deepak Obhrai, 69, Tanzanian-born Canadian politician, MP (since 1997), liver cancer.
Stuart O'Connell, 84, New Zealand Catholic bishop, Bishop of Rarotonga (1996–2011).
Schoschana Rabinovici, 86, French-born Lithuanian-Israeli Holocaust survivor and writer.
Jocelyne Roy-Vienneau, 63, Canadian politician, Lieutenant Governor of New Brunswick (since 2014), cancer.
Rob Storey, 83, New Zealand politician, MP (1984–1996), Minister of Transport (1990–1993).
Alexandra Strelchenko, 82, Russian folk singer, People's Artist of the RSFSR (1984).
Helen Young, 93, New Zealand broadcasting manager (RNZ Concert).
Japanese convicted murderers, executed by hanging.
Koichi Shoji, 64.
Yasunori Suzuki, 50.

3
Miklós Ambrus, 86, Hungarian water polo player, Olympic champion (1964).
Katreese Barnes, 56, American musician (Juicy), musical director (Saturday Night Live) and songwriter ("Dick in a Box"), Emmy Award winner (2007), breast cancer.
Henri Belolo, 82, French music producer (The Ritchie Family, Village People) and songwriter.
Jean-Claude Bouttier, 74, French boxer and actor (Les Uns et les Autres).
Cliff Branch, 71, American football player (Oakland Raiders).
Steven Gubser, 47, American physicist, climbing accident.
Basil Heatley, 85, British athlete, marathon world-record holder (1964) and Olympic silver medallist (1964).
Nikolai Kardashev, 87, Russian astrophysicist (SETI), developer of the Kardashev scale.
Sir Brian Lochore, 78, New Zealand Hall of Fame rugby union player and coach (national team, Wairarapa-Bush), bowel cancer.
Joe Longthorne, 64, English singer and impressionist (Live from...), throat cancer.
Damien Lovelock, 65, Australian musician (The Celibate Rifles), cancer.
Léon Mbou Yembi, 73, Gabonese politician, Deputy (2006–2011), complications from diabetes.
Vigilio Mich, 88, Italian Olympic cross-country skier (1956).
Anne E. Monius, 55, American religious scholar.
L. Brooks Patterson, 80, American lawyer and politician, County Executive of Oakland County, Michigan (since 1992), pancreatic cancer.
Lewis Pérez, 74, Venezuelan politician, Secretary General of Acción Democrática (1998–2000) and Senator (1994–1999), heart attack.
Thomas Remengesau Sr., 89, Palauan politician, President (1988–1989) and Vice President (1985–1988).
John Philip Saklil, 59, Indonesian Roman Catholic prelate, Bishop of Timika (since 2003).
Marcel Toader, 56, Romanian rugby union player (Steaua București, national team), heart attack.
Mike Troy, 78, American swimmer, Olympic champion (1960), world-record holder – 200m butterfly (1959–1960).

4
Anwara Begum, 70, Bangladeshi politician, MP (1986–1988).
Kanti Bhatt, 88, Indian Gujarati author and journalist.
Norden Tenzing Bhutia, 69, Nepalese musician, throat cancer.
Ernie Bowman, 84, American baseball player (San Francisco Giants).
Prudencio Cardona, 67, Colombian boxer, world flyweight champion (1982).
Jim Donlevy, 82, Canadian football coach (Alberta Golden Bears).
Andrea Fraunschiel, 64, Austrian politician, MP (2004-2005).
André Goosse, 93, Belgian linguist.
Thomas Gulotta, 75, American government official, County Executive of Nassau County, New York (1987–2001).
Ivo Lill, 66, Estonian glass artist.
Jim Morgan, 79, Canadian politician, MHA (1972–1989).
Ann Nelson, 61, American particle physicist, hiking accident.
Harald Nickel, 66, German footballer, cancer.
Nuon Chea, 93, Cambodian politician, Acting Prime Minister (1976) and chief ideologist of Khmer Rouge.
Larry Rakestraw, 77, American football player (Chicago Bears).
Stu Rosen, 80, American voice director and actor (Hulk Hogan's Rock 'n' Wrestling, The Legend of Prince Valiant, Fraggle Rock: The Animated Series), cancer.
Willi Tokarev, 84, Russian-American singer-songwriter.
Bob Wilber, 91, American jazz clarinetist and bandleader.

5
Erwin Bittmann, 91, Austrian Olympic rower (1948).
Rashiram Debbarma, Indian politician, MLA (1977–1998).
Salinda Dissanayake, 61, Sri Lankan politician, MP (since 1994).
Else Kollerud Furre, 96, Norwegian politician.
Sidney Goldstein, 92, American demographer.
Lizzie Grey, 60, American rock musician (London, Spiders & Snakes), complications from Lewy body disease.
Teresa Ha, 81, Hong Kong actress (Flower in the Rain, Big Brother Cheng, Killer Constable).
Jimi Hope, 62, Togolese musician and painter.
Josef Kadraba, 85, Czech footballer (Sparta Prague, Slavia Prague, national team).
Bjorg Lambrecht, 22, Belgian racing cyclist, race crash.
John Lowey, 61, English footballer (Sheffield Wednesday, Blackburn Rovers, Chester City).
Russell Middlemiss, 90, Australian footballer (Geelong), stroke.
Asif Mohseni, 84, Afghani marja'.
Toni Morrison, 88, American author (The Bluest Eye, Song of Solomon, Beloved), Nobel laureate (1993), Pulitzer Prize winner (1988).
Jeffrey Tarrant, 63, American hedge fund investor, film producer and philanthropist, brain cancer.

6
Kamal Boullata, 77, Palestinian artist and art historian.
Rod Coleman, 93, New Zealand motorcycle racer.
Krystyna Dańko, 102, Polish humanitarian, Righteous Among the Nations (1998).
S. A. M. Hussain, 80, Indian politician, MLA (2001–2006).
Danny Doyle, 79, Irish folk singer ("The Rare Ould Times").
Mick Miller, 92, Australian police officer, Chief Commissioner of Victoria Police (1977–1987).
Mrs YGP, 93, Indian educationist, founder and dean of the Padma Seshadri Bala Bhavan, cardiac arrest.
Steve Parr, 92, English footballer (Liverpool).
Alejandro Serrano, 86, Ecuadorian politician, Vice President (2005–2007).
George F. Simmons, 94, American mathematician.
Sushma Swaraj, 67, Indian politician, MP (1996–1999, 2009–2019), Chief Minister of Delhi (1998), Minister of External Affairs (2014–2019), cardiac arrest.
George Whaley, 85, Australian actor (Stork) and film director.
Zhuo Renxi, 88, Chinese chemist and academician (Chinese Academy of Sciences).

7
Subby Anzaldo, 86, American politician.
David Berman, 52, American singer-songwriter (Silver Jews, Purple Mountains) and poet (Actual Air), suicide by hanging.
Helmut Bez, 88, German playwright.
Chris Birch, 68, American politician, member of the Alaska House of Representatives (2017–2019) and Senate (since 2019), aortic dissection.
Michel Che, 77, French chemist.
Barbara Crane, 91, American photographer.
Orlando Grootfaam, 44, Surinamese footballer (S.V. Robinhood).
Donald F. Klein, 90, American psychiatrist.
Patricia Louisianna Knop, 78, American screenwriter (Lady Oscar, 9½ Weeks, Siesta).
Kary Mullis, 74, American biochemist, Nobel laureate (1993), pneumonia.
J. Om Prakash, 92, Indian film director (Aap Ki Kasam, Aakhir Kyon?) and producer (Aandhi).
Nancy Reddin Kienholz, 75, American artist.
Rostislav Rybakov, 81, Russian writer.
Herm Urenda, 81, American football player (Oakland Raiders).
Fabio Zerpa, 90, Uruguayan parapsychologist and ufologist.

8
Era. Anbarasu, 78, Indian politician, MP (1989–1996).
Jacques Arnoux, 81, French Olympic racewalker (1960).
Shamnad Basheer, 43, Indian legal scholar. (body discovered on this date)
Cosmas Batubara, 80, Indonesian politician and activist, Minister of Manpower (1988–1993) and Housing (1978–1988), and member of People's Representative Council (1967–1978), cancer.
Ernie Colón, 88, American comic book artist (Casper the Friendly Ghost, Richie Rich, Damage Control), cancer.
Theodore L. Eliot Jr., 91, American diplomat, Ambassador to Afghanistan (1973–1978), heart disease.
Malcolm T. Elliott, 73, Australian radio and television personality.
Lee Bennett Hopkins, 81, American educator and poet, chronic obstructive pulmonary disease.
Stanisław Konturek, 87, Polish physiologist and gastroenterologist.
Mazhar Krasniqi, 87, Yugoslavian-born New Zealand Muslim community leader.
Charlach Mackintosh, 84, British Olympic alpine skier (1956, 1960).
Manfred Max-Neef, 86, Chilean economist.
Jean-Pierre Mocky, 90, French film director (Les Dragueurs, The Miracle), screenwriter and actor (The Abandoned).
Dave Parks, 77, American football player (New Orleans Saints, San Francisco 49ers).
Fabrizio Saccomanni, 76, Italian civil servant and economist, Minister of Economy and Finance (2013–2014), Director General of the Bank of Italy (2006–2013), heart attack.
Les Strongman, 94, Canadian ice hockey player (Nottingham Panthers, Wembley Lions).
Marius Todericiu, 49, Romanian football player (Brașov, Weismain) and manager (Darmstadt 98), suicide.
Erling Wicklund, 75, Norwegian jazz trombonist and journalist.

9
Ahmad Lai Bujang, 69, Malaysian politician, MP (2008–2018).
José Desmarets, 93, Belgian politician, Minister of Defence (1979–1980).
Mé Aboubacar Diomandé, 31, Ivorian footballer (Stella Club d'Adjamé).
Rodney Falkson, 77, South African cricketer.
Paul Findley, 98, American politician, member of the U.S. House of Representatives (1961–1983).
Altair Gomes de Figueiredo, 81, Brazilian footballer (Fluminense, national team).
Ronald Jones, 67, American conceptual artist.
Fahrudin Jusufi, 79, Serbian football player (Partizan, Eintracht Frankfurt, Yugoslavia national team), Olympic champion (1960) and manager.
Oscar Malbernat, 75, Argentinian football player (Estudiantes de la Plata, national team) and manager.
Bill Mills, 99, American baseball player (Philadelphia Athletics).
Huw O. Pritchard, 91, Welsh-born Canadian chemist.
Barry Stroud, 84, Canadian philosopher, brain cancer.
Claudio Taddei, 52, Swiss singer and plastic artist.
Takis, 93, Greek sculptor.
Sir Michael Uren, 95, British businessman and philanthropist.
Hendricus Vogels, 76, Dutch-born Australian Olympic cyclist (1964).

10
Bao Kexin, 67, Chinese politician and business executive, Vice Governor of Guizhou Province (2002–2007).
Joseph Begich, 89, American politician, member of the Minnesota House of Representatives (1975–1993).
Freda Dowie, 91, English actress (Distant Voices, Still Lives, The Old Curiosity Shop, The Omen).
Jeffrey Epstein, 66, American financier (Bear Stearns), philanthropist (Jeffrey Epstein VI Foundation) and convicted sex offender, suicide by hanging.
Jim Forbes, 95, Australian politician, MP (1956–1975), Minister for Health (1966–1971) and Immigration (1971–1972), Military Cross recipient.
Michael Hall, 84, English cricketer (Nottinghamshire).
Edward H. Jennings, 82, American academic administrator, President of the University of Wyoming (1979–1981) and the Ohio State University (1981–1990, 2002).
Igor Kachmazov, 50, Russian footballer (Spartak Ordzhonikidze, Spartak Vladikavkaz, Lokomotiv St. Petersburg).
Aïssata Kane, 80, Mauritanian politician.
Radoslav Katičić, 89, Croatian linguist.
Jo Lancaster, 100, British RAF pilot.
Cándido Sibilio, 60, Dominican-born Spanish Olympic basketball player (1980).
Ann Barr Snitow, 76, American writer (Dissent), cancer.
Piero Tosi, 92, Italian costume designer (Senso, Yesterday, Today and Tomorrow, The Night Porter), Honorary Oscar winner (2013).
Bernard Unabali, 62, Papua New Guinean Roman Catholic prelate, Bishop of Bougainville (since 2009).
Marty Wood, 86, Canadian Hall of Fame rodeo cowboy, cancer.
Wu Ningkun, 98, Chinese writer and translator.

11
Bluey Adams, 84, Australian footballer (Melbourne), cancer.
Freddy Bannister, 84, English rock concert promoter, cancer.
Tred Barta, 67, American hunter (The Best and Worst of Tred Barta).
Doug Clarke, 85, English footballer (Hull City).
John Coffey, 101, Irish hurler (Tipperary, Boherlahan-Dualla).
Jim Cullum Jr., 77, American jazz cornetist, broadcaster (Riverwalk Jazz) and music preservationist.
Dejan Čurović, 51, Serbian footballer (Partizan, Vitesse), leukaemia.
John Dillon, 76, Scottish footballer (Albion Rovers).
Kerry Downes, 88, English architectural historian. 
Darryl Drake, 62, American football player (Washington Redskins) and coach (Chicago Bears, Pittsburgh Steelers).
Michael E. Krauss, 84, American linguist.
Ningali Lawford, 52, Australian actress (Bran Nue Dae, Last Cab to Darwin), asthma attack.
Shelby Lyman, 83, American chess player and commentator.
Geoff Malcolm, 88, New Zealand physical chemist (Massey University).
Barbara March, 65, Canadian actress (Star Trek), cancer.
Walter Martínez, 37, Honduran footballer (Victoria, Beijing Guoan, national team), heart attack.
László Máté, 67, Hungarian politician, MP (1994–1998).
Gordan Mihić, 80, Serbian screenwriter (Black Cat, White Cat, Time of the Gypsies, Balkan Express).
Sergio Obeso Rivera, 87, Mexican Roman Catholic cardinal, Bishop of Papantla (1971–1974) and Archbishop of Xalapa (1979–2007).
Charles Santore, 84, American children's book and magazine illustrator (TV Guide).
J. Neil Schulman, 66, American novelist, pulmonary embolism.
Emil Svoboda, 90, Czech footballer (Sparta Prague, Czechoslovakia national team).

12
DJ Arafat, 33, Ivorian disc jockey and musician, traffic collision.
João Carlos Barroso, 69, Brazilian actor, pancreatic cancer.
José Luis Brown, 62, Argentinian football player (Estudiantes de la Plata, national team) and manager, World Cup winner (1986), complications from Alzheimer's disease.
Jean-Paul Capelle, 74, French Olympic field hockey player (1968).
Krishna Chandra Chunekar, 90/91, Indian ayurvedic practitioner.
Danny Cohen, 81, Israeli-American Hall of Fame computer scientist.
Florin Halagian, 80, Romanian football player (Dinamo București) and manager (Argeș Pitești, national team).
Reuven Hammer, 86, American-Israeli rabbi and journalist (The Jerusalem Post).
Terence Knapp, 87, English actor (Urge to Kill, The Valiant, Othello).
Rahul Kukreti, 43, American cricketer.
Robyn Léwis, 89, Welsh author, politician and archdruid, Vice President of Plaid Cymru (1970–1976).
Lu Yonggen, 88, Chinese agronomist and plant geneticist, President of South China Agricultural University (1983–1995).
Jim Marsh, 73, American basketball player (Portland Trail Blazers) and broadcaster (Seattle SuperSonics).
Paule Marshall, 90, American writer.
Hussein Salem, 85, Egyptian-Spanish businessman, co-owner of East Mediterranean Gas Company.
Mizanur Rahman Shelley, 76, Bangladeshi politologist and politician, brain haemorrhage.
John Michael Sherlock, 93, Canadian Roman Catholic prelate, Bishop of London, Ontario (1978–2002).
Jan Simonsen, 66, Norwegian politician, MP (1989–2005), cancer.
Michael T. Sangma, 41, Indian politician, MLA (2013–2018), heart attack.
Frank Tsao, 94, Chinese-born Malaysian-Singaporean shipping magnate and philanthropist, kidney failure.

13
Kip Addotta, 75, American comedian.
Josette Arène, 95, French Olympic swimmer (1948, 1952).
Cecilia Caballero Blanco, 105, Colombian socialite, First Lady (1974–1978).
Umesh Bhat Bhavikeri, 72,  Indian politician, MLA (1989–1994).
Guo Zhenqian, 86, Chinese politician and banker, Governor of Hubei (1985–1990), Vice Governor of the People's Bank of China (1990–1993), Auditor General (1994–1998).
Lily Leung, 90, Hong Kong actress (In the Realm of Fancy, Bar Bender, Lives of Omission), cancer.
Tim Means, 75, American environmentalist, complications from diabetes.
Vladimír Ptáček, 64, Czech Olympic basketball player (1976).
Brunilda Ruiz, 83, American ballet dancer.
Carole Satyamurti, 80, British poet.
René Taelman, 74, Belgian football manager (Burkina Faso national team, JS Kabylie, Akhdar), lung cancer.
Nadia Toffa, 40, Italian journalist and television presenter (Le Iene), brain cancer.

14
Tõnu Aav, 80, Estonian actor (The Lark, Õnne 13).
Suleiman Bakhit, 41, Jordanian entrepreneur and comics writer.
Carrol Boyes, 65, South African artist and executive.
Águeda Dicancro, 80, Uruguayan sculptor.
Polly Farmer, 84, Australian footballer (Geelong).
Brian Job, 67, American swimmer, Olympic bronze medalist (1968).
Ivo Malec, 94, Croatian-born French composer.
Karim Olowu, 95, Nigerian Olympic sprinter and long jumper (1952, 1956).
Héctor Rivoira, 59, Argentine football player (Almirante Brown) and manager (Quilmes, Atlético Tucumán), cancer.
Ugo Sansonetti, 100, Italian writer and masters athlete.
Reginald Scarlett, 84, Jamaican cricketer (national team).
Ben Unwin, 41, Australian actor (Home and Away).
Helena Wilsonová, 81, Czech photographer.
Gjergj Xhuvani, 55, Albanian film director (Slogans, East, West, East: The Final Sprint) screenwriter and producer.

15
Lalbihari Bhattacharya, 81, Indian politician, MLA (1982–1987).
V. B. Chandrasekhar, 57, Indian cricketer (Tamil Nadu, Goa, national team), heart attack.
Claire Cloninger, 77, American Christian songwriter and author.
Madan Mani Dixit, 96, Nepalese writer, pneumonia.
Vladimir Fomichyov, 59, Russian footballer (Kuban Krasnodar, Dynamo Moscow, Kuzbass Kemerovo).
Samuel Gelfman, 88, American film producer, complications from heart and respiratory disease.
Luigi Lunari, 85, Italian writer.
Eddie Marlin, 89, American professional wrestler and promoter (CWA), multiple organ failure.
Noel Pope, 87, New Zealand politician, Mayor of Tauranga (1983–1989, 1995–2001).
Qin Hanzhang, 111, Chinese engineer and food scientist, heart attack.
Antonio Rastrelli, 91, Italian politician, MP (1979–1995) and President of Campania (1995–1999).
Vidya Sinha, 71, Indian actress (Rajnigandha, Chhoti Si Baat, Qubool Hai), respiratory failure.
Glenn Tasker, 67, Australian sports administrator, President of the Australian Paralympic Committee (2013–2018).
Henrik Westman, 78, Swedish politician.
Wrestling Pro, 81, American professional wrestler (GCCW).

16
Gustavo Barreiro, 60, Cuban-born American politician, member of the Florida House of Representatives (1998–2006), heart attack.
Roland Brown, 93, American physician.
Princess Christina of the Netherlands, 72, Dutch royal, bone cancer.
Bruce Deans, 58, New Zealand rugby union player (Canterbury, national team), cancer.
Peter Fonda, 79, American actor and screenwriter (Easy Rider, Ulee's Gold, 3:10 to Yuma), lung cancer.
Felice Gimondi, 76, Italian racing cyclist, Tour de France (1965), Vuelta a España (1968) and Giro d'Italia (1967, 1969, 1976) winner, heart attack.
Jim Hardy, 96, American football player (Los Angeles Rams, Chicago Cardinals, Detroit Lions) and sporting executive.
C. S. Holling, 88, Canadian ecologist.
David Layzer, 93, American astrophysicist.
Sahura Mallick, 85, Indian politician, MLA (1974–1977), (1980–1985) and (1995–2000).
Faisal Masud, 64, Pakistani doctor and professor, cardiac arrest.
Mike McGee, 80, American football player (St. Louis Cardinals), sporting executive and athletic director (University of South Carolina).
José Nápoles, 79, Cuban-born Mexican Hall of Fame boxer, world welterweight champion (1969–1970, 1971–1975).
Anna Quayle, 86, British actress (Grange Hill, Chitty Chitty Bang Bang, A Hard Day's Night), Tony winner (1963), Lewy body dementia.
Rizia Rahman, 79, Indian-born Bangladeshi novelist.
Bobby Smith, 78, English footballer (Barnsley, Chelmsford City).
Alexandre Soares dos Santos, 83, Portuguese businessman, CEO and President of Jerónimo Martins (1969–2013).
Penka Stoyanova, 69, Bulgarian basketball player, Olympic silver medallist (1980) and bronze medallist (1976).
Alla Ter-Sarkisiants, 82, Russian historian.
Richard Williams, 86, Canadian-British animator and director (The Thief and the Cobbler, Who Framed Roger Rabbit, A Christmas Carol), three-time Oscar winner, cancer.

17
Damodar Ganesh Bapat, 84, Indian social worker.
Cedric Benson, 36, American football player (Texas Longhorns, Cincinnati Bengals, Chicago Bears), traffic collision.
Walter Buser, 93, Swiss politician, Chancellor (1981–1991).
Allen Church, 91, American alpine skiing sports official.
Jacques Diouf, 81, Senegalese diplomat, Director General of the Food and Agriculture Organization (1994–2011).
Ronald Gray, 87, Australian Olympic athlete (1956).
Rosemary Kuhlmann, 97, American mezzo-soprano and actress.
Donald A. B. Lindberg, 85, American mathematician, Director of the United States National Library of Medicine (1984–2015), fall.
José A. Martínez Suárez, 93, Argentine film director (Yesterday's Guys Used No Arsenic) and screenwriter, pneumonia.
Bill McDonagh, 91, Canadian ice hockey player (New York Rangers).
Thelma Nava, 87, Mexican poet and journalist.
Ivan Oman, 89, Slovenian politician, independence key figure and farmer, MP (1992-1996.
Teodoro Palacios, 80, Guatemalan Olympic high jumper (1968), pneumonia.
Suffian Rahman, 41, Malaysian footballer (Negeri Sembilan, Melaka Telekom, national team), heart attack.
Neelum Sharma, 50, Indian anchorwoman (Doordarshan), cancer.
Tabu Taid, 77, Indian educationist.
Lawrence Van Huizen, 89, Malaysian Olympic hockey player (1964).
Camillo Zanolli, 89, Italian Olympic skier (1956).

18
Soma Bhupala, 92, Indian politician, MLA (1962–1977).
Kathleen Blanco, 76, American politician, Governor (2004–2008) and Lieutenant Governor of Louisiana (1996–2004), member of the Louisiana House (1984–1989), ocular melanoma.
Giulio Chierchini, 91, Italian comics writer and artist.
Gary Cooper, 80, English rugby league football player and coach.
René Feller, 76, Dutch football manager. 
Helmuth Froschauer, 85, Austrian choral conductor. 
Conrad Gorinsky, 83, Guyanese-born British chemist.
Gillian Hanna, 75, Irish actress (Les Misérables, All the Queen's Men, Oliver Twist), autoimmune disease.
Chad Holt, 46, American writer and actor.
Denis Kuljiš, 67, Croatian writer and journalist.
Karel Kuklík, 82, Czech photographer.
Robert Ouko, 70, Kenyan runner, Olympic champion (1972).
Encarna Paso, 88, Spanish actress (Begin the Beguine), pneumonia.
Peter H. Reill, 80, American historian.
Paul Smith, 88, American baseball player (Pittsburgh Pirates, Chicago Cubs).
Sasson Somekh, 86, Iraqi-born Israeli writer and translator.
Jack Whitaker, 95, American sportscaster (CBS, ABC), The NFL Today host (1971–1974).
Yu Zhengui, 73, Chinese historian and scholar of Islam, Vice President of the Islamic Association of China.

19
James R. Alexander, 88, American sound engineer (Coal Miner's Daughter, Terms of Endearment, Weird Science).
Bai Yan, 99, Chinese-born Singaporean actor, pneumonia.
Benjamin N. Bellis, 95, American air force lieutenant general.
Barry Bennett, 63, American football player (New Orleans Saints, New York Jets, Minnesota Vikings), shot.
George Ganchev, 79, Bulgarian politician, MP (1995–2001).
Zakir Hussain, 85, Pakistani field hockey player, Olympic champion (1968) and silver medallist (1956).
Al Jackson, 83, American baseball player (Pittsburgh Pirates, New York Mets, St. Louis Cardinals).
Mohammed Zahur Khayyam, 92, Indian music director and composer (Kabhie Kabhie, Umrao Jaan, Dil-e-Nadaan), lung infection.
Enn Kokk, 82, Swedish politician and journalist.
Lars Larsen, 71, Danish retailer, founder of Jysk, liver cancer.
Mike Leaf, 58, American college basketball coach (Winona State).
Philippe Leroy, 79, French politician, Senator (2001–2017).
Gina Lopez, 65, Filipino environmentalist, Secretary of Environment and Natural Resources (2016–2017), brain cancer.
Pertti Mäkipää, 78, Finnish footballer (TaPa, Upon Pallo, national team).
Zbigniew Makowski, 89, Polish painter.
John Matthews, 91, Australian politician, member of the New South Wales Legislative Council (1981–1991).
Jagannath Mishra, 82, Indian politician, Chief Minister of Bihar (1975–1977, 1980–1983, 1989–1990).
Jack Perkins, 85, American reporter and television host (NBC Nightly News, Biography).
Carlos Porrata, c. 73, Puerto Rican television personality.
David Rubinstein, 86, American social historian.
Jan Ruff O'Herne, 96, Australian comfort women rights activist.
Bette Stephenson, 95, Canadian physician and politician.
Larry Taylor, 77, American bass guitarist (Canned Heat), cancer.
Kazuo Wada, 90, Japanese business executive, Chairman of Yaohan.

20
Colin Beard, 77, Australian football player (South Fremantle, Richmond) and manager.
Richard Booth, 80, Welsh bookseller.
Giovanni Buttarelli, 62, Italian civil servant, European Data Protection Supervisor (since 2014).
Russ Conway, 70, American sports journalist (The Eagle-Tribune) and hockey beat writer (Boston Bruins).
Rudolf Hundstorfer, 67, Austrian trade unionist and politician, president of the Austrian Trade Union Federation, heart attack.
Peter Knobel, 76, American rabbi.
Ernesto Lariosa, 74, Filipino writer and poet, liver failure.
Li Houwen, 92, Chinese surgeon, President of China Medical University.
Harry B. Luthi, 85, American businessman, Mayor of Greenville, South Carolina (1982–1983).
John H. McArthur, 85, Canadian-American academic, Dean of the Harvard Business School (1980–1995).
Alexandra Nazarova, 79, Russian actress (But What If This Is Love, Sofiya Perovskaya, Air Crew), People's Artist of Russia (2001).
Lico Reyes, 73, Mexican-American actor (Problem Child) and politician.
Larry Siegel, 93, American humorist (Mad Magazine, The Carol Burnett Show), Parkinson's disease.
Akhilesh Kumar Singh, 59, Indian politician, MLA (1993–2017), cancer.
Edson Warner, 89, Canadian Olympic sports shooter (1952, 1960).
Kelsey Weems, 51, American basketball player (Quad City Thunder, Hartford Hellcats, Yakima SunKings).

21
Dina bint Abdul-Hamid, 89, Jordanian princess, Queen consort (1955–1957).
Ifeanyi Chiejine, 36, Nigerian Olympic footballer (2000, 2008), (CSHVSM, F.C. Indiana).
Norma Croker, 84, Australian runner, Olympic champion (1956).
Julian Daan, 74, Filipino comedian, actor and politician, heart failure.
Babulal Gaur, 89, Indian politician, Chief Minister of Madhya Pradesh (2004–2005).
Richard Gregson, 89, British agent, film producer and screenwriter.
Paulo Mandlate, 85, Mozambican Roman Catholic prelate, Bishop of Tete (1976-2009).
Jian Ming, 58, Chinese poet, writer and literary critic.
John W. Neill, 85, British Olympic field hockey player (1960, 1964, 1968).
Nguyễn Tiến Sâm, 73, Vietnamese jet fighter pilot.
Celso Piña, 66, Mexican cumbia singer, composer and accordionist, heart attack.
Lawrence Reade, 88, New Zealand cricketer (Central Districts).
Alexander M. Schenker, 94, Polish-American professor of Slavic studies.
Kurt Stendal, 68, Danish footballer (Hvidovre IF, SK Sturm Graz, national team).
Ines Torelli, 88, Swiss comedian and actress (Fascht e Familie).

22
Junior Agogo, 40, Ghanaian footballer (Bristol Rovers, Nottingham Forest, national team).
Gary Ray Bowles, 57, American serial killer, executed by lethal injection.
Norman Frederick Charles III, 78, British professional wrestler (The Royal Kangaroos), cancer.
Peter Chingoka, 65, Zimbabwean cricket player (South Africa African XI) and administrator.
Bobby Dillon, 89, American football player (Green Bay Packers).
Tim Fischer, 73, Australian politician and diplomat, Deputy Prime Minister (1996–1999), Ambassador to the Holy See (2009–2012), acute myeloid leukemia.
Jimmy Fleming, 90, Scottish footballer (Workington). (death announced on this date)
Gao Heng, 89, Chinese legal scholar and historian.
Fulati Gidali, 108, Indian folk singer.
Werner H. Kramarsky, 93, American public official and art collector.
Vitaly Logvinovsky, 78, Russian stage actor, People's Artist (2006).
Tom Nissalke, 87, American basketball coach (Houston Rockets, San Antonio Spurs, Utah Jazz).
Yves Oger, 68, French Olympic rower (1972).
Gerard O'Neill, 76, American investigative journalist and news editor (The Boston Globe), Pulitzer Prize winner (1970).
Margarita Plavunova, 25, Russian hurdler and model, heart failure.
Morton Tubor, 102, American film and sound editor (Cannonball, The Big Red One, Knots Landing).

23
Mary Abbott, 98, American painter.
Muzaffar Ahmed, 97, Bangladeshi politician.
John Bluett, 89, English cricketer.
Larissa Bonfante, 88, Italian-American classicist.
Clint Conatser, 98, American baseball player (Boston Braves).
Amath Dansokho, 82, Senegalese politician.
Mario Davidovsky, 85, Argentine-American composer (Synchronisms), Pulitzer Prize winner (1971).
Carlo Delle Piane, 83, Italian actor (An American in Rome, A School Outing, Christmas Present), Nastro d'Argento winner (1984).
Leo Gauriloff, 62, Finnish musician, cancer.
Kito Junqueira, 71, Brazilian actor (Eternamente Pagú) and politician.
David Koch, 79, American businessman (Koch Industries) and political financier (Americans for Prosperity).
Rick Loomis, 72, American game designer, founder of Flying Buffalo, lymphatic cancer.
Massimo Mattioli, 75, Italian cartoonist and comics writer and artist (Squeak the Mouse, Pinky).
Peter Moscatt, Australian rugby league player (Eastern Suburbs).
Roaring Lion, 4, British racehorse, euthanised.
Silvia Ruegger, 58, Canadian Olympic marathon runner (1984), cancer.
Lou Slaby, 77, American football player (New York Giants).
Sheila Steafel, 84, South African-born British actress (Daleks' Invasion Earth 2150 A.D., Quatermass and the Pit, The Ghosts of Motley Hall), leukemia.
Walter Thiel, 70, German theoretical chemist, President of the World Association of Theoretical and Computational Chemists (since 2011).
Mike Thomas, 66, American football player (Washington Redskins, San Diego Chargers).
Wang Guodong, 88, Chinese painter.
Tim Wohlforth, 86, American political activist.
Stuart York, 80, English cricketer.
Egon Zimmermann, 80, Austrian ski racer, Olympic champion (1964).

24
David Akiba, 78, American photographer.
Tex Clevenger, 87, American baseball player (Boston Red Sox, Washington Senators, New York Yankees).
Michael Eagar, 85, English cricketer (Gloucestershire). 
Blanca Fernández Ochoa, 56, Spanish alpine ski racer, Olympic bronze medallist (1992).
Koffi Gahou, 71, Beninese artist, actor, and director.
Tesfaye Gebreyesus, 84, Ethiopian football referee.
Stephen S. Goss, 57, American judge, member of the Georgia Court of Appeals (2018–2019), suicide.
Katherine Graham, 96, American golf administrator.
Lutz-Michael Harder, 76, German lyric tenor and academic voice teacher.
Andrew Horn, 66, American film director, producer and screenwriter (The Nomi Song, We Are Twisted Fucking Sister!), cancer.
Arun Jaitley, 66, Indian politician, MP (since 2000), Minister of Defence (2014, 2017) and Finance (2014–2019).
Peter Kempadoo, 92, Guyanese writer, heart disease.
Bob Kilcullen, 83, American football player (Chicago Bears).
Ia McIlwaine, 84, British librarian.
Thandi Ndlovu, 65, South African construction executive and philanthropist, traffic collision.
Tony Nichols, 81, Australian Anglican prelate, Bishop of North West Australia (1992–2003).
Sidney Rittenberg, 98, American journalist, scholar and linguist.
Vlado Strugar, 96, Serbian historian.
Lodewijk Christiaan van Wachem, 88, Dutch executive.
Dick Woodard, 93, American football player (New York Giants).

25
Sheikh Maqsood Ali, 85, Bangladeshi civil servant.
Herbert Beattie, 93, American opera singer. 
Timothy Bell, Baron Bell, 77, British advertising and public relations executive (Bell Pottinger).
Clora Bryant, 92, American jazz trumpeter (International Sweethearts of Rhythm), heart attack.
Alf Burnell, 95, English rugby league footballer (Hunslet, Leeds Rhinos, national team).
Gül Çiray, 79, Turkish Olympic middle-distance runner (1960).
Jenaro Flores Santos, 76, Bolivian trade unionist and politician, founder of Unified Syndical Confederation of Rural Workers of Bolivia.
Sally Floyd, 69, American computer scientist, cancer.
Reb Foster, 83, American radio DJ (KRLA) and band manager (The Turtles, Three Dog Night, Steppenwolf).
Jonathan Goldstein, 50, British composer, plane crash.
Al Haynes, 87, American airline pilot, United Airlines Flight 232 crash survivor.
B. M. Kutty, 89, Pakistani journalist and politician.
Mona Lisa, 97, Filipino actress (Insiang, Giliw Ko, Cain at Abel).
Eliseo Mattiacci, 78, Italian artist.
Bernard Monnereau, 83, French Olympic rower (1960, 1964), world champion (1962).
Vince Naimoli, 81, American businessman, founder of the Tampa Bay Rays.
Ferdinand Piëch, 82, Austrian Hall of Fame business executive and engineer (Audi Quattro), Chairman of Volkswagen Group (1993–2015).
Mitch Podolak, 71, Canadian folk music promoter, co-founder of the Winnipeg Folk Festival, complications from septic shock.
Anne Grete Preus, 62, Norwegian musician, cancer.
Jerry Rook, 75, American basketball player (New Orleans Buccaneers, Arkansas State Red Wolves).
Jafar Umar Thalib, 57, Indonesian Islamic militant and teacher, founder of Laskar Jihad.
Lodewijk Woltjer, 89, Dutch astronomer.
Fernanda Young, 49, Brazilian novelist, screenwriter and actress (Os Normais), cardiac arrest.

26
Khalilur Rahman Babar, 67, Bangladeshi actor (Rangbaz), film director and producer.
Pal Benko, 91, French-born Hungarian-American chess grandmaster.
Christian Bonaud, 62, French Islamologist and philosopher, marine accident.
Neal Casal, 50, American musician (Ryan Adams & the Cardinals, Blackfoot, Chris Robinson Brotherhood), suicide.
Kanchan Chaudhary Bhattacharya, 72, Indian police officer, Director General of the Uttarakhand Police (2004–2007).
Chen Jiayong, 97, Chinese metallurgist and chemical engineer.
Colin Clark, 35, American soccer player (Colorado Rapids, Houston Dynamo, national team), heart attack.
Richard Conrad, 84, American opera singer and voice teacher.
Felix Donnelly, 89, New Zealand Roman Catholic priest, academic and talkback host (Radio Pacific).
Ray Henwood, 82, Welsh-born New Zealand actor (Gliding On).
Tom Jordan, 99, American baseball player (Chicago White Sox, Cleveland Indians, St. Louis Browns), complications from a heart attack.
Dr. Karonte, 62, Mexican professional wrestler (CMLL).
Ian Kerr, 54, Canadian academic lawyer, cancer.
Helmut Krauss, 78, German actor.
Pita Paraone, 73, New Zealand politician, MP (2002–2008, 2014–2017).
Isabel Toledo, 59, Cuban-born American fashion designer, breast cancer.
Walmir Alberto Valle, 81, Brazilian Roman Catholic prelate, Bishop of Zé Doca (1991–2002) and Joaçaba (2003–2010), cancer.
Gavin Watson, 71, South African prison executive, CEO of Bosasa (since 2000), traffic collision.
Geoffrey Wraith, 72, English rugby league player and coach.
Mir Tanha Yousafi, 64, Pakistani poet, novelist and writer.

27
Pedro Bell, 69, American artist and illustrator (Parliament-Funkadelic).
Nimu Bhowmik, 83, Indian actor (Arun Barun O Kiranmala, Nater Guru, Gyarakal).
Albert Vickers Bryan Jr., 92, American judge, Chief Judge of the District Court for the Eastern District of Virginia (1985–1991), pneumonia.
Yigal Cohen-Orgad, 81, Israeli politician, MP (1977–1988) and Minister of Finance (1983–1984).
Jessi Combs, 39, American racer and television host (Xtreme 4x4, MythBusters, Overhaulin'), jet-car crash.
Frances Crowe, 100, American peace activist.
Wadie P. Deddeh, 98, Iraqi-born American politician, member of the California State Assembly (1967–1983) and Senate (1983–1993).
Sven Trygve Falck, 76, Norwegian politician, MP (1981–1985).
Donnie Fritts, 76, American keyboardist (Kris Kristofferson) and songwriter, complications from heart surgery.
Saif Ahmad Al Ghurair, 95, Emirati businessman, Chairman of Al Ghurair Group (since 1960).
Abel González Chávez, 76, Colombian radio and television host, stroke.
Sir Dawda Jawara, 95, Gambian politician, Prime Minister (1962–1970) and President (1970–1994).
Kopi John, 25, Papua New Guinean cricketer (national team).
John Ssenseko Kulubya, 84, Ugandan real estate investor, complications from pneumonia.
Rajnish Kumar, 59, Indian politician, member of the Punjab Legislative Assembly (since 2012).
Philippe Madrelle, 82, French politician, Senator (since 1980).
Richard Mamiya, 94, American heart surgeon.
José Mateo, 91, Spanish racing cyclist.
Paul Meger, 90, Canadian ice hockey player (Montreal Canadiens), Stanley Cup champion (1953).
Stephen O. Murray, 69, American sociologist, lymphoma.
Sōju Nosaka II, 81, Japanese musician.
Tom O'Hara, 77, American Olympic middle-distance runner (1964).
Park Han-yong, 68, South Korean businessman, President of POSCO (2012–2013).
Guy Parsons, 93, British accountant.
Paul Peterson, 98, Canadian football player (Hamilton Flying Wildcats).
Leopoldo Pomés, 87, Spanish photographer and publicist.
Tahu Potiki, 52, New Zealand Māori leader, chief executive of Te Rūnanga o Ngāi Tahu (2002–2006).
Thanadsri Svasti, 92, Thai food writer and broadcaster, cholangiocarcinoma.
Martin Weitzman, 77, American economist.
Gustav Wiklund, 85, Finnish actor and painter.
Zhang Zong, 90, Chinese crystallographer, member of the Chinese Academy of Sciences.

28
Michel Aumont, 82, French actor (The Toy, A Sunday in the Country, Dangerous Moves).
Pascal Gnazzo, 98, French racing cyclist.
Donnie Green, 71, American football player (Buffalo Bills, Philadelphia Eagles, Detroit Lions).
Steve Hiett, 79, British photographer.
Nancy Holloway, 86, American singer and actress.
Giuseppe Iamonte, 70, Italian mobster ('Ndrangheta), fall.
Nicolás Leoz, 90, Paraguayan football executive, President of CONMEBOL (1986–2013).
Max McDonald, 92, Australian politician, member of the Victorian Legislative Assembly (1979–1992).
Nie Yuanzi, 98, Chinese academic administrator, leader of the Red Guards, respiratory failure.
Sogyal Rinpoche, 72, Tibetan Dzogchen lama and writer (The Tibetan Book of Living and Dying), founder of Rigpa organization, pulmonary embolism.
George P. Schiavelli, 71, American judge.
Sean Stephenson, 40, American self-help author and motivational speaker, head injury.
Valeriy Syrov, 72, Russian-born Ukrainian football player (Karpaty Lviv, Metalurh Zaporizhya) and manager.
Nikola Trojanović, 90, Yugoslav Olympic swimmer.
Paz Undurraga, 89, Chilean singer and composer.

29
Don Aickin, 84, New Zealand obstetrician and gynaecologist (University of Otago, Christchurch).
Biba Caggiano, 82, Italian-born American restaurateur and cookbook author.
Lila Cockrell, 97, American politician, Mayor of San Antonio (1975–1981, 1989–1991).
Terrance Dicks, 84, English screenwriter (Doctor Who, Crossroads, Space: 1999).
Nita Engle, 93, American watercolorist.
Richard Geist, 74, American politician, member of the Pennsylvania House of Representatives (1978–2013), heart attack.
Jean Guillou, 88, French Olympic gymnast (1952, 1956).
Janusz Hajnos, 51, Polish Olympic ice hockey player (1992).
Guy Innes-Ker, 10th Duke of Roxburghe, 64, British aristocrat.
Juhani Kärkinen, 83, Finnish Olympic ski jumper (1960), world champion (1958).
Miklós Kocsár, 85, Hungarian composer.
Jim Langer, 71, American Hall of Fame football player (Miami Dolphins, Minnesota Vikings), heart failure.
Jim Leavelle, 99, American homicide detective, police escort for Lee Harvey Oswald, heart attack.
Brad Linaweaver, 66, American science fiction writer, cancer.
Maria Dolors Renau, 82, Spanish politician, Deputy (1982–1986, 1989–1993), MEP (1986–1987) and president of Socialist International Women (1999–2003).
Mohammad Muslim, Indian politician, MLA (1996–2002, 2012–2017).
Randy Romero, 61, American Hall of Fame jockey, stomach cancer.
Achille Silvestrini, 95, Italian-born Vatican diplomat and Roman Catholic cardinal, Prefect of the Congregation for the Oriental Churches (1991–2000).
Vladimir Veličković, 84, Serbian painter.

30
Chester Aaron, 96, American writer. 
Deyan Ranko Brashich, 78, American attorney and writer.
Gordon Bressack, 68, American television writer (Pinky and the Brain, Animaniacs, Bionic Six).
Franco Columbu, 78, Italian bodybuilder and actor (Conan the Barbarian, The Terminator), Mr. Olympia winner (1976, 1981), heart attack.
Jim Colvin, 81, American football player. 
Stephen Cretney, 83, British legal scholar. 
Elaine Darling, 83, Australian politician, MP (1980–1993).
Dennis Fentie, 68, Canadian politician, Premier of Yukon (2002–2011) and MLA (1996–2011), cancer.
Ken France, 78, New Zealand footballer.
Lamberto Giorgis, 87, Italian football player (Taranto) and manager (Lecce, Sampdoria).
Bernard F. Grabowski, 96, American politician, member of the House of Representatives (1963–1967).
A. James Gregor, 90, American historian.
Valerie Harper, 80, American actress (The Mary Tyler Moore Show, Rhoda, Valerie), Emmy Award winner (1971, 1972, 1973, 1975), leptomeningeal carcinomatosis.
James Cellan Jones, 88, Welsh film and television director (The Roads to Freedom, The Forsyte Saga, Fortunes of War), Chairman of BAFTA (1983–1985), stroke.
Park Taesun, 77, South Korean writer.
Hans Rausing, 93, Swedish businessman, Chairman of Tetra Pak (1985–1993).
Udo Schaefer, 92, German lawyer and Baháʼí author. 
Shevin Smith, 44, American football player (Tampa Bay Buccaneers).
Quentin Wilson, 76, American engineer, one of the original Rocket Boys.

31
Jeff Blackshear, 50, American football player (Seattle Seahawks, Baltimore Ravens, Kansas City Chiefs), pancreatic cancer.
Ryszard Czerniawski, 67, Polish lawyer and economist, vice-chairman of the board of Warsaw Stock Exchange (1994–2006) and vice-ombudsman (2012–2015).
Leslie H. Gelb, 82, American journalist (The New York Times) and government official, Assistant Secretary of State (1977–1979).
Alec Holowka, 35, Canadian video game developer (Aquaria, I'm O.K – A Murder Simulator, Night in the Woods), suicide.
Anthoine Hubert, 22, French racing driver, GP3 Series champion (2018), race crash.
William J. Larkin Jr., 91, American politician, member of the New York State Assembly (1979–1990) and Senate (1991–2018).
Michael Lindsay, 56, American voice actor (Bleach, Naruto, Digimon).
Sergio Lobato García, 64, Mexican politician, federal deputy in the LXI Legislature of Congress.
Marita Lorenz, 80, German-born American conspiracy theorist, heart failure.
Mary Ma, 66, Chinese business executive, CFO of Lenovo, pancreatic cancer.
Jane Mathews, 78, Australian judge, Supreme Court of New South Wales (1987–1994).
Wim Statius Muller, 89, Curaçaoan composer and pianist.
Hal Naragon, 90, American baseball player (Cleveland Indians, Washington Senators/Minnesota Twins) and coach (Detroit Tigers).
Jim Pettie, 65, Canadian ice hockey player (Boston Bruins), cancer.
Hugo Pfaltz, 87, American politician.
Earl Ravenal, 88, American foreign policy analyst, academic, and writer.
Donald Rooum, 91, English cartoonist and activist.
Agnar Sandmo, 81, Norwegian economist, cancer.
Mamadou Tew, 59, Senegalese footballer (Club Brugge, Charleroi, national team).
Marshall P. Tulin, 93, American hydrodynamics engineer.
Immanuel Wallerstein, 88, American sociologist, developer of world-systems theory.
Wang Buxuan, 97, Chinese thermal physicist, member of the Chinese Academy of Sciences.
Zbigniew Zaleski, 72, Polish politician.

References

2019-08
 08